Medicine Rock State Historic Site near Heil, North Dakota was listed on the National Register of Historic Places in 1986.  Other names associated with the site are Medicine Hill, Medicine Butte, Me-me-ho-pa, Medicine Stone, and Miho.

It is the largest of six sites in North Dakota with rock art paintings, and was the location of ceremonies, and has been long known to natives and non-natives.  Lewis and Clark did not visit it but wrote of it.

See also
 Medicine Rocks State Park
 Deer Medicine Rocks

References

Properties of religious function on the National Register of Historic Places in North Dakota
Protected areas of Grant County, North Dakota
North Dakota State Historic Sites
National Register of Historic Places in Grant County, North Dakota
Petroglyphs in North Dakota